Christine Mary Hamill (24 July 1923 – 24 March 1956) was an English mathematician who specialised in group theory and finite geometry.

Education 
Hamill was one of the four children of English physiologist Philip Hamill. She attended St Paul's Girls' School and the Perse School for Girls. In 1942, she won a scholarship to Newnham College, Cambridge, becoming a wrangler in 1945.

She won a Newnham research fellowship in 1948, and received her Ph.D. at the University of Cambridge in 1951. Her dissertation, The Finite Primitive Collineation Groups which contain Homologies of Period Two,
concerned the group-theoretic properties of collineations, geometric transformations preserving straight lines;
she also published this material in three journal papers. J. A. Todd, who supervised her research work, observed that "the detailed results contained in her papers" were "of permanent value".

Career 
After completing her doctorate, Hamill was appointed to a lectureship in the University of Sheffield. In 1954, she was appointed lecturer in the University College, Ibadan, Nigeria. She died of polio there in 1956, four months before she was to have married.

Notes 

1923 births
1956 deaths
20th-century  English  mathematicians
People educated at St Paul's Girls' School
Alumni of Newnham College, Cambridge
Fellows of Newnham College, Cambridge
Academics of the University of Sheffield
Academic staff of the University of Ibadan
Group theorists
People educated at the Perse School for Girls
Deaths from polio
British geometers
20th-century women mathematicians